Amnesia is the tenth studio album by Spanish metal band Hamlet. The album was recorded and produced in Spain with producer Carlos Santos at Sadman Studios, and mixed and mastered in Sweden by Fredrik Nordström and Henrik Udd at Studio Fredman (In Flames, Soilwork, Opeth).

Track listing 
"Origen" - 1:39
"La Fuerza del Momento" - 3:38
"Entre la Niebla" - 4:41
"Mi Soledad" - 3:32
"Deja Vu" - 5:15
"La Sombra del Pasado" - 4:47
"Despertar Sin Vida" - 4:26
"Un Mundo en Pausa" - 4:01
"Estado de Fuga" - 3:48
"Al Tercer Dia" - 4:08
"Desesperacion" - 5:30

Members 
J. Molly - Vocals
Luis Tárraga - Lead/rhythm guitar
Alberto Marín - Lead/rhythm guitar, backing vocals
Álvaro Tenorio - Bass
Paco Sánchez - Drums

Sources 
info in zona-zero
Review in mariskalrock.com

2011 albums
Hamlet (band) albums